

First Austrian Republic (1919-1938) 

 Infantry weapons
 Steyr M1912
 Steyr-Mannlicher M1895
 MP 34 
 MG 30
 Schwarzlose MG M.07/12
 Armored car
 ADGZ
 Tankette
 Carro Veloce CV-33
 Carro Veloce CV-35
 Towed artillery
 Skoda 75 mm Model 15
 Skoda 100 mm Model 1916
 10 cm Feldhaubitze M 99
 Aircraft (Austrian Air Force (1927-1938))
 Breda Ba 28
 Caproni Ca.100
 Caproni Ca. 133
 De Havilland DH.60
 DFS Habicht 
 Fiat CR.20 
 Fiat CR.30
 Fiat CR.32
 Fiat A 120/A 
 Focke-Wulf Fw 44
 Focke-Wulf Fw 56 
 Focke-Wulf Fw 58 
 Gotha Go 145
 Hopfner HS 9/35 
 IMAM Ro.37
 Junkers F 13 
 Udet U 12

Second Austrian Republic (since 1955) 

 Infantry weapons
 M1911 pistol
 Walther P38
 M1 Garand
 M1 Carbine
 Steyr MPi 69
 MP40
 PPSh-41
 Browning Automatic Rifle
 StG 58
 MG 42
 M1919 Browning machine gun
 Bazooka
 M72 LAW
 M40 recoilless rifle
 20 mm Fliegerabwehrkanone 65/68
 Vehicles
 T-34
 M24 Chaffee
 M41 Walker Bulldog
 M42 Duster
 Charioteer
 M47 Patton
 M60 Patton
 AMX-13
 SK-105 Kürassier
 Schützenpanzer A1
 M578 Light Recovery Vehicle
 Jaguar 1
 M8 Greyhound
 M3 Half-track
 GMC CCKW
 Willys MB
 Aircraft
See: Austrian Airforce

References

Military equipment of Austria
Austrian Army
Austria
Equipment